Responsoria et alia ad Officium Hebdomadae Sanctae spectantia is a collection of music for Holy Week by Italian composer Carlo Gesualdo, published in 1611. It consists of three sets of nine short pieces, one set for each of Maundy Thursday, Good Friday and Holy Saturday, and a psalm and a hymn. The work was written for unaccompanied voices: two soprano parts, alto, two tenor parts, and bass.

The texts of the Responsories for Holy Week are related to Jesus's Passion and are sung in between the lessons at Tenebrae. Gesualdo's settings are stylistically madrigali spirituali - madrigals on sacred texts. As in Gesualdo's later books of madrigals, he uses particularly sharp dissonance and shocking chromatic juxtapositions, especially in the parts highlighting text passages having to do with Christ's suffering, or the guilt of St. Peter in having betrayed Jesus.

Content

Tenebrae Responsories for Maundy Thursday
In monte Oliveti
Tristis est anima mea
Alex Ross writes about Gesualdo's setting of this responsory: "... begins with desolate, drooping figures that conjure Jesus’ prayer in Gethsemane (“My soul is exceeding sorrowful, even unto death”). It then accelerates into frenzied motion, suggesting the fury of the mob and the flight of Jesus’ disciples. There follows music of profound loneliness, radiant chords punctured by aching dissonances, as Jesus says, “I will go to be sacrificed for you.” The movement from inner to outer landscape, from chromatic counterpoint to block harmonies, humanizes Jesus in a way that calls to mind Caravaggio’s New Testament paintings of the same period, with their collisions of dark and light."<ref>Alex Ross. "Gesualdo: 'The Prince of Darkness'" in The New Yorker. December 19 and 26, 2011.</ref>
Ecce vidimus eum
Amicus meus osculi
Judas mercator pessimus
Unus ex discipulis meis
Eram quasi agnus innocens
Una hora non potuistis
Seniores populi consilium
Tenebrae Responsories for Good Friday
Omnes amici mei dereliquerunt me et praevaluerunt insidiantes mihi
Velum templi scissum est
Vinea mea electa, ego te plantavi
Tamquam ad latronem existis cum gladiis et fustibus cemprehendere me
Tenebrae factae sunt, dum crucifixissent Jesum Judaei
Animam meam dilectam tradidi in manus iniquorum
Tradiderunt me in manus impiorum
Jesum tradidit impius summis principibus sacerdotum, et senioribus populi
Caligaverunt oculi mei fletu meo
Tenebrae Responsories for Holy Saturday
Sicut ovis ad occisionem
Jerusalem, surge
Plange quasi virgo
Recessit pastor noster
O vos omnes
Ecce quomodo moritur justus
Astiterunt reges terrae
Aestimatus sum
Sepulto Domino
"et alia" – settings of:
Miserere mei, Deus
Benedictus
For the Lauds of Holy Week

Publication of the score
 Carlo Gesualdo, Responsoria et alia ad Officium Hebdomadae Sanctae spectantia, Giovanni Giacomo Carlino (Ioannes Iacobus Carlinus), 1611.
 Wilhelm Weismann and Glenn Watkins (editors). Tenebrae Responsoria in Carlo Gesualdo: Sämtliche Werke. Hamburg, Deutscher Verlag für Musik, 1957-1967.

Recordings
Complete
 Gesualdo: Répons de la semaine sainte, A Sei Voci, 2CD Erato 97411; Warner Classics 2564 62782 (1982–1984)
 Gesualdo: Tenebrae, The Hilliard Ensemble, ECM New Series 1422/23 843 867 (1990)
 Carlo Gesualdo – Responsoria 1611, Collegium Vocale Gent, direction Philippe Herreweghe, PHI LPH010 (2012)
 Carlo Gesualdo: Responsoria 1611, La Compagnia del Madrigale, Glossa GCD922803 (2013)
 Gesualdo: Tenebrae,  (2019)
Selections
 Tenebrae Responsories for Maundy Thursday, The King's Singers, Signum SIGCD048 (2004)
 Tenebrae Responsoria (Maundy Thursday and Good Friday), Ensemble Arte Musica, direction Francesco Cera, Brilliant Classics 94804 (2014)
 Tenebrae Responses for Good Friday, Taverner Consort & Choir, direction Andrew Parrott, Sony Classical SK62977 (2000)
 Tenebrae Responsories for Holy Saturday, The Tallis Scholars, direction Peter Phillips, Gimell, CDGIM 015 (1987)
 Sabbato Sancto: Responsoria (Holy Saturday), Ensemble Vocal Européen, direction Philippe Herreweghe, Harmonia Mundi France HMF790120 (1990)
 Responsoria'' (Holy Saturday), Ensemble De Labyrintho, direction Walter Testolin, Stradivarius STR33842 (2009)

References

External links
 
 

Tenebrae
Compositions by Carlo Gesualdo